Genmou (Chinese 根牟) was a vassal state during the Zhou Dynasty in China. It was created by the Eastern Barbarians; its capital was south of Mousing, Qishui. (沂水县南之牟乡) In 600 BC, it was conquered by Lu.

References 

 Chunqiu-Duke Xuan-Year Nine 取根牟；Chunqiu-Duke Xuan-Year Nine
 Zuo zhuan-Duke Zhao-Year Eight 大搜于红，自根牟到圩卫，革车千乘
 Duzhu 根牟，东夷国也，今琅邪阳都县有牟乡
 Lushi：“根牟，曹姓，子爵。鲁宣公取之。杜预谓琅邪阳都东南之牟乡城。”
 Sui Book 安丘下云，“开皇十六年置，曰牟山。大业初，改名。”

Zhou dynasty|1st-millennium BC disestablishments in China